Central District is an urban district in Taichung City, Taiwan. It is located at the heart of the city, though it has seen decline in recent years as newer districts nearby like Xitun has seen growth. It is the smallest district and township-level subdivision in Taiwan and the only one with an area under 1 km².

History
Taichung City was first settled in this district. Since the area used to be a swamp, they settled near a small hill known as Dadun (大墩). By the Qing Dynasty this area developed as a prosperous town.

The area saw mass development in the Japanese era under the supervision of Goto Shinpei. Under the plan created by W. K. Burton and Hamano Yashiro, a grid plan was adopted. The Taichung Train Station was built during this time.

Under the Republic of China, several Japanese districts, which included Tachibana-cho, Midori-cho, Sakae-cho, Taisho-cho, Takara-cho, Nishiki-cho, Shintomi-cho, Yanagi-cho, Hatsune-cho, and Wakamatsu-cho were combined to form Central District.

Central District used to be the heart of all business and commerce in Taichung. However, since the district was planned in the Japanese era, the roads are too tight to accommodate for modern growth. Therefore, the area has seen decline as newer districts like Xitun to the west grew rapidly. In 2010, the Taichung City Hall moved from Central District to Xitun District. There has been recent efforts to renew the city, with local businesses utilizing the historical buildings in the city to create unique shops and restaurants.

Administrative divisions

Tourist attractions

 Central Bookstore
 Chang Hwa Bank Headquarters and Museum
 Miyahara Ice Cream
 Old Taichung Train Station
 Taichung City Second Market

Transportation
Central District is served by the TRA Taichung Station by rail and Provincial Highway 12 by road.

See also
 Taichung

References

External links

  

Districts of Taichung